Tulketh Priory was a priory in Ashton-on-Ribble, Lancashire, England. The priory was the home of a group of Cistercian monks from Savigny Abbey in Normandy until they moved to Furness Abbey in 1127. Tulketh Hall was later built on the site of the priory.

References

Buildings and structures in Preston
Cistercian monasteries in England
Demolished buildings and structures in England
Monasteries in Lancashire
Tulketh